Dilip Ghosh may refer to:
Dilip Ghosh (politician) (born 1964)
Dilip Ghosh (economist) (fl. 2000s)
Dilip Ghosh (film director) (born 1955)